José Ignacio Hualde is a Spanish linguist specialised in Basque linguistics and in Spanish synchronic and diachronic phonology, professor of linguistics in the Department of Spanish and Portuguese, and in the Department of Linguistics, at the University of Illinois at Urbana–Champaign. He is also the current vice president of the Association for Laboratory Phonology.

Bibliography

Authored books 
 Catalan (1992)
 Basque Phonology (1991)
 Euskararen azentuerak [the accentual systems of Basque] (1997)

Co-authored books 
 The sounds of Spanish (2005)
 Introducción a la lingüística hispánica (2001)
 A Phonological Study of the Basque Dialect of Getxo (1992)
 The Basque Dialect of Lekeitio (1994)

Co-edited books 
 Generative Studies in Basque Linguistics (1993)
 Towards a History of the Basque Language (1995)
 A Grammar of Basque (2003)

Journal articles 
 Hualde, José I. "Unstressed words in Spanish." Language Sciences 31.2-3 (2009): 199–212.
 Hualde, José I., Oihana Lujanbio, and Francisco Torreira. "Lexical tone and stress in Goizueta Basque." Journal of the International Phonetic Association 38.1 (2008): 1–24.
 Hualde, José I., Miquel Simonet, and Francisco Torreira. "Postlexical contraction of nonhigh vowels in Spanish." Lingua 118 (2008): 1906–1925.
 Hualde, José I., and Armin Schwegler. "Intonation in Palenquero." Journal of Pidgin and Creole Languages 23.1 (2008): 1–31.
 Eddington, David, and José I. Hualde. "El abundante agua fría: Hermaphroditic Spanish nouns." Studies in Hispanic and Lusophone Linguistics 1.1 (2008): 5–31.
 Chitoran, Ioana, and José I. Hualde. "From hiatus to diphthong: the evolution of vowel sequences in Romance." Phonology 24 (2007): 37–75.
 Hualde, José I., and Koldo Zuazo. "The standardization process of the Basque language." Language Problems and Language Planning 31.2 (2007): 143–168.
 Hualde, José I. "Stress removal and stress addition in Spanish." Journal of Portuguese Linguistics 5.2 (2006): 59–89.

References 

Basque-language scholars
Living people
Phonologists
People from Ciudad Real
Year of birth missing (living people)
University of Illinois Urbana-Champaign faculty
Spanish expatriates in the United States
University of Southern California alumni
Complutense University of Madrid alumni
Spanish academics